Mythological Horses is an alternative rock band from Seattle Washington. The band consists of Shawn Holley (guitar and vocals), and Jest Commons (formerly of The Moldy Peaches, drums). The band was founded in Anchorage, Alaska in 2003.

Mythological Horses have released two full studio albums on Hovercraft Records, plus multiple EPs and singles on various other record labels. They have continually toured the United States since 2005, playing and headlining at many festivals, most notably the New York Antifolk Festival in 2010.

History
Mythological Horses first came about in the mid 1990s when founder Shawn Holley and his childhood friend Chris Vanbibber began writing and performing songs. Both age 16, they started playing the punk/coffee house scene in Anchorage, Alaska under the name Churpbleepuh. Drawing heavily on such influences as Nirvana, The Cars, Sonic Youth, and The Dead Milkmen, Churpbleepuh played shows until 2000. At this time Holley left Alaska and began pursuing a solo career as an anti-folk artist, touring the United States excessively, performing over 200 shows per year. As his writing style began to lean back toward his punk and rock roots, Holley reformed the band and started performing officially as Mythological Horses in 2005.

Over the next decade, Mythological Horses continued consistent touring, sharing the stage with such bands as The Pharmacy, Blowfly, Joe Genaro of The Dead Milkmen, Mickey Avalon, Eagles Of Death Metal, Mike Watt, MC Lars, Kimya Dawson, T.S.O.L., and Smoke And Smoke featuring Spencer Moody of The Murder City Devils and members of godheadSilo. During this time, Mythological Horses released four albums (Idaho -2008/ Fairview Luvin-2008/ Fuck It-2009/ Super Joe Long Cocaine Mountain-2010) on Shawn Holley's label Lime Street Records. The bands posters (created by artist Pat Moriarity)   were featured in two episodes in season 6 of the Showtime hit show Weeds.

In May 2013, Mythological Horses entered Witch Ape Studios and recorded their first full-length studio album under the production of Tad Doyle of Subpop band TAD, Andrew Crowley of Organica Recording, and Jack Endino who has worked closely with Nirvana and other Subpop artists. This album was released on vinyl record and digital download in 2014 on Hovercraft Records out of Portland, Or. The band received high praise in international press, and was featured on a KEXP Music That Matters podcast, Young Reckless Hearts, in April 2014. 

In December 2017 Mythological Horses returned to Witch Ape studios in Seattle, WA. to record their second full-length studio album. It was engineered and produced by Tad Doyle (TAD) with Kurt Danielson (TAD) on bass, Kurt Block on lead guitar. The album was recorded in 7 days.

Discography

Albums
 Fairview Luvin (October 2008) Lime Street Records
 Idaho (December 2008) Lime Street Records
 Fuck It (May 2009) Lime Street Records
 Super Joe Long Cocaine Mountain (March 2010) Lime Street Records
 Mythological Horses (January 2014) Hovercraft Records
 YYYMF! (April 2019) Hovercraft Records

Singles and compilations
 A Tribute To Bad Lyrics (Summer 2010) Ear Illusion Records
 More Songs For Friends (January 2014) Hovercraft Records
 "Don’t Think" b/w "Don’t Care" cassette single (2014) Godless America Records

Videos
 "Cold Heart" (2014) directed by Brett Roberts
 "All Alone" (2015) directed by Shawn Holley
 "Hot Dog" (2015) directed by Eli Luchak

References

External links
 Hovercraft Records
 Godless America Records
 Mythological Horses on Bandcamp
 Riot Act Media

2005 establishments in Alaska
Indie rock musical groups from Alaska
Musical groups established in 2005
Musical groups from Seattle
Musical groups from Anchorage, Alaska